Anametrisi (Unmeasured, also under the name Dangerous Game) is a 1982 Greek mystery film directed by Giorgos Karypidis and starring Zoi Laskari, Aris Retsos, Stefanos Stratigos and Spyros Fokas.

Cast
Zoi Laskari ..... Anna Parisi
Aris Retsos ..... Konstantinos Mavros
Stefanos Stratigos ..... police officer
Spyros Fokas ..... Petros Parisis
Giorgos Sabanis
Nikolas Anagnostakis
Thomas Chalvatzis
Panos Iliopoulos
Paris Katsivelos
Dina Konsta ..... woman in black
Marika Nezer ..... aunt
Manos Tsilimidis
Ioulia Vatikioti ..... girl at the door
Filippos Vlachos

Awards
EKKA Awards for Best Longest Film at the 1982 Thessaloniki Film Festival.

External links
 
 Anametrisi at cine.gr 

1982 films
1980s mystery films
Greek crime drama films
1980s Greek-language films